Paragliding at the 2008 Asian Beach Games was held from 20 October to 24 October 2008 in Bali, Indonesia.

Medalists

Accuracy

Cross-country

Medal table

Results

Accuracy

Men's individual
20–23 October

Men's team
20–23 October

Women's individual
20–23 October

Women's team
20–23 October

Cross-country

Men's individual
20–24 October

Men's team
20–24 October

Women's individual
20–24 October

Women's team
20–24 October

References
 Official site

2008 Asian Beach Games events
2008
2008 in air sports